Body of the Life Force is the debut studio album from underground hip hop recording artist Afu-Ra. Originally due to be released on Gee Street Records, it was released on October 10, 2000, via Koch Records. Recording sessions took place at D&D Studios in New York. Production was handled by from DJ Premier, DJ Roach, 5 Boro Deep, Da Beatminerz, DJ Muggs, Joe Quinde, Mike Rone, P. King and True Master. It features guest appearances from GZA, Hannibal Stax, Jahdan Blakkamoore, Krumbsnatcha, Ky-Mani Marley, Masta Killa, M.O.P. and Smif-N-Wessun.

Track listing

Charts

Singles chart positions

References

External links

Afu-Ra albums
E1 Music albums
2000 debut albums
Albums produced by DJ Muggs
Albums produced by DJ Premier
Albums produced by True Master
Albums produced by Da Beatminerz